Faldela Williams (1952 – 25 May 2014) was a South African cook and cookbook writer whose books inspired generations of cooks after her to preserve the culinary heritage of South Africa's Cape Malay people.

Biography
Faldela Adams was born in 1952 on Pontac Street, in District Six, of Cape Town, South Africa and attended Rahmaniyah Primary School. She was trained to cook by her grandmother, a respected caterer, in the Sixth Municipal District of Cape Town and after she understood the basics, began to help in preparing food. Around 1975, Adams married Ebrahim Williams and subsequently, the couple had three children: Riefqah, Aisha and Saadiq.

Career
Williams opened her own wedding catering service and became a known expert on the cooking of Cape Malay, publishing three cookbooks on the cuisine. In 1988, she published The Cape Malay Cookbook, which has become a staple reference for cooks throughout South Africa and is known internationally. The book has also been seen by academics as an important work for writing the cultural contributions of Muslim descendants of Malaysian slaves back into the broader South African heritage. The book gave a comprehensive selection of recipes in an easy to prepare format with a guide to frequently used spices and seasonings. It was successfully printed in both English and Afrikaans.

Until Williams published The Cape Malay Cookbook, few recipe books had been used or printed.  Use of recipes typically was held in low esteem, because local cooks judged that it demonstrated a lack of cooking skill. While a recent development, other cookbooks followed and the publication brought forth a generation of younger cooks who wished to preserve their dishes and cooking traditions. The cookbooks were also a "groundbreaking" means of allowing Malay women, who had previously been portrayed as silent domestic workers, to speak for themselves.

William's second cookbook, More Cape Malay Cooking was a follow-up book to the original publication. Recipes were given with clear and simple instructions, featuring the spices that add distinction to Cape Malay cuisine. As with her first book, it became a go-to guide for both those just learning to cook and more experienced cooks, who enjoyed Cape Malay-style food. Her last book, The Cape Malay Illustrated Cookbook (2007) simplified traditional recipes to make them more practical and easier to prepare.

Around 2009, Williams and her son, Saadiq, opened a restaurant in her neighborhood, which bore her name. She was also featured in many articles published by the Cape Argus as an expert on food, cooking for religious holidays and on modifying dishes to reflect more health conscious trends. Williams was an executive committee representative of her mosque in Cape Town's Claremont suburb.

Death and legacy
Williams died on 25 May 2014 after having had a heart attack six weeks prior. Williams cookbooks have gone into several subsequent editions. She was one of the featured women in a presentation at the Bo-Kaap Museum on the contributions of Muslim women to South African heritage. Upon her death, Yusuf Larney owner of Bo-Kaap Kombuis Malay Restaurant, paid tribute to her in a program broadcast on Primedia Broadcasting.

Works

References

Citations

Biography

 

1952 births
2014 deaths
People from Cape Town
South African people of Malay descent
20th-century South African women writers
Women cookbook writers
South African cookbook writers